The 1981 Tooth Cup was the 8th edition of the NSWRFL Midweek Cup, a NSWRFL-organised national club Rugby League tournament between the leading clubs and representative teams from the NSWRFL, the BRL, the CRL, the QRL and the NZRL.

A total of 16 teams from across Australia and New Zealand played 23 matches in a round-robin format with teams playing 2 games each with the top 8 teams advanced to a knockout stage, with the matches being held midweek during the premiership season.

Qualified Teams

Venues

Round 1

Round 2

Quarter finals

Semi finals

Final

The 1981 Tooth Cup Final attracted a still standing (as of 2020) Leichhardt Oval attendance record of 23,000.

Player of the Series
 Steve Rogers (Cronulla-Sutherland Sharks)

Golden Try
 Mitch Brennan (South Sydney)

Sources

 http://www.rugbyleagueproject.org/

1981
1981 in Australian rugby league
1981 in New Zealand rugby league